Morgan Daniel Nicholls (born 18 March 1971) is an English musician, member of English pop band Senseless Things and best known for performing with Muse, Gorillaz, The Streets and Lily Allen. He has released one solo album under the mononym Morgan.

Career
Nicholls began his career with Senseless Things, with whom he released four studio albums between 1989 and 1995. He was subsequently involved with Vent 414 until 1997. In 2002, Morgan was involved as a producer on QueenAdreena's Drink Me. In August 2004, he temporarily joined the alternative rock band Muse at the V Festival, filling in for bassist Christopher Wolstenholme who had broken his wrist playing football. 

In 2004, Morgan Nicholls joined Damon Albarn to play bass on the 2005 Gorillaz album Demon Days. Morgan knew the band from his friendship with Gorillaz co-creator Jamie Hewlett. In 2005 and 2006 he joined the Gorillaz live band for a live set of show for Demon Days, playing two 5 night residencies at the Manchester Opera House in Manchester and the Apollo Theater in Harlem, New York.

In 2006, Muse recruited Nicholls as a touring member on keys, percussion and guitar; he performed with them until 2022, when he was replaced by Dan Lancaster.

Nicholls was the tour director and bassist for Lily Allen on the first half of her 2009 world tour.

In late 2018, Nicholls, Cass Browne, Ade Emsley and Des Murphy, formed a psychedelic-punk band, Circle 60. They released their first EP, SawnOff ShotGold, in 2019.

Discography

Solo

Albums
2000: Organized

Singles
1999: "Miss Parker"
1999: "Soul Searching"
2000: "Flying High"
2000: "Sitting in the Sun"

EPs
2012: Moonlight Rhino (Includes 3 songs; Moonlight Rhino, Sydney Sunset and Balloon Busting)

with Senseless Things
1989: Postcard C.V.
1991: The First of Too Many
1993: Empire of the Senseless
1995: Taking Care of Business

with Vent 414
1996: Vent 414

with Gorillaz
2005: ‘’Demon Days’’
2005: Demon Days: Live at the Manchester Opera House
2006: Demon Days Live | Demon Days: Live at New York’s Apollo Theatrewith Muse
2008: HAARP2013: Live at Rome Olympic Stadium2018: Muse: Drones World Tour2020: Muse – Simulation Theorywith Circle 60
2019: SawnOff ShotGold''

Personal life
Nicholls is the son of Billy Nicholls, singer, songwriter, record producer and musical director.

References

External links

Living people
English keyboardists
English record producers
English male guitarists
Singers from London 
Musicians from London 
Male bass guitarists
English songwriters
1971 births
21st-century English bass guitarists
21st-century British male musicians
Gorillaz members